The  is a railway line owned and operated by the West Japan Railway Company. It connects San'yō-Onoda to Nagato, both in Yamaguchi Prefecture, Japan.

History
The Sanyo Railway Company opened the Asa to Minami-Omine section in 1905 to haul coal. The company was nationalised in 1906, and the Japanese Government Railway (JGR) extended the line to Mine in 1909.

The Mine Light Railway Company opened the Mine to Shigeyasu section in 1916. That company was nationalised in 1920, and the JGR opened the section to Ofuku the same year. The line was extended to Nagato in 1924, completing the line.

Freight services ceased in 1984, except for limestone haulage from Shigeyasu, which ceased in 2009.

All services were suspended after heavy rainstorm flooding in July 2010. Despite estimates that repairs would take up to three years to complete, the Mine Line was restored to full service on 26 September 2011, in time for the 66th National Sports Festival, "Oidemase Yamaguchi Kokutai," which began in October 2011.

Route data
Operating Company: 
West Japan Railway Company (Services and tracks)
Distance:
Asa — Nagatoshi: 46 km
Gauge: 
Stations: 12
Double-tracking: None
Electrification: Not electrified
Railway signalling:
Automatic occlusive (special)

Stations
All stations are in Yamaguchi Prefecture.

See also
 List of railway lines in Japan

References

External links

 Notice on schedule of substitution bus services (JR West) 

Lines of West Japan Railway Company
Rail transport in Yamaguchi Prefecture